Say It Ain't So, Joe is a chamber opera in two acts by Curtis K. Hughes inspired by text drawn from the public record of the 2008 United States vice-presidential debate where vice presidential candidate Joe Biden is addressed by Sarah Palin in a similar manner as the famous quote referring to Shoeless Joe Jackson. Commissioned and produced by Guerilla Opera, Say It Ain't So, Joe premiered in Boston on September 19, 2009 at the Boston Conservatory Zack Box Theater.

Premiere

Cast

Instrumentalists
Kent O’Doherty, saxophones
Rane Moore, clarinets
Javier Caballero, cello
Mike Williams, percussion.

Production staff 
Nathan Troup, director
Julia Noulin-Merat, scenic designer
Corey Rancourt, lighting designer
Rudolf Rojahn, production manager
Brendan P. Buckley, stage manager
Anthony Scibilia, production cameraman.

Composer's view
"When watching the US Vice Presidential debate in 2008, I was struck by the extraordinary musical contrasts between the voices of Sarah Palin and Joe Biden, as well as the convergence of two such fascinating life stories, both containing tragic, heroic, and comic elements.  The audience for my opera Say it ain't so, Joe will experience a surreal and fractured vision of that remarkable encounter, as well as brief glimpses of other contemporaneous events and political figures, with some fantastical digressions." – Curtis K. Hughes

Synopsis

Act 1
Prelude

Scene One: January 2009: The Palin Residence. Wasilla, Alaska

Interlude

Scene Two: October 2, 2008: United States vice-presidential debate, 2008, Washington University in St. Louis, Missouri

Scene Three: August 28, 2008

Interlude

Scene Four: October 2, 2008

Scene Five: October 2008: Good Morning America television interview

Scene Six: October 2, 2008

Act 2
Prelude

Scene One: Late 2008: Television Interview

Scene Two: October 2, 2008

Interlude

Scene Three: Late October 2008: Republican campaign rally

Scene Four: October 2, 2008

Scene Five: in illo tempore

Scene Six: October 2, 2008

References

Powers, Keith, "An opera about Sarah Palin? You betcha!", Boston Herald, September 15, 2009 
Weininger, David, "In this opera production, the pitch is political", Boston Globe, September 18, 2009 
The Sarah Palin Blog

Operas
Operas set in the United States
Operas about politicians
English-language operas
2009 operas
Operas set in the 21st century
Cultural depictions of Sarah Palin
Cultural depictions of Hillary Clinton
Cultural depictions of Joe Biden